Uzuntəpə (also, Novogol’sk and Novogolovka) is a village and municipality in the Jalilabad Rayon of Azerbaijan.  It has a population of 6,150.  The municipality consists of the villages of Uzuntəpə and Novoqolovka.

References 

Populated places in Jalilabad District (Azerbaijan)